I Could Go On Singing is a 1963 British-American musical drama film directed by Ronald Neame, starring Judy Garland (in her final film role) and Dirk Bogarde. Originally titled The Lonely Stage, the film was renamed so that audiences would know that Garland sings in it; she had not sung in a film since A Star Is Born in 1954.

Although not a huge box-office success on release, the film won Garland much praise for her performance. Bogarde claimed that he had substantially rewritten Garland's lines, with her consent.

The film had its world premiere at the Plaza Theatre in London's West End on 6 March 1963.

Plot
Jenny Bowman (Judy Garland) is a successful concert singer who regularly tours the world. During a stay in London, she visits recently widowed David Donne (Dirk Bogarde), a prominent surgeon. More than a decade ago, the two had an affair that led to the birth of Matt, who is raised by David alone and has been told that he was adopted. Although Jenny and David agreed that Matt would never know the truth, David takes Jenny to Matt's boarding school in Canterbury so that she may meet him just once. Jenny and Matt hit it off and the three spend the whole day together. Jenny invites the two to her concert at the London Palladium, but David is unable to make it because of work in Rome.

With David absent and under the impression that Matt is back at school, Jenny and Matt spend a few days together exploring London. Jenny's manager and assistant try to cover for Matt by calling his school, but word about his absence gets back to David in Rome, who is furious. When David returns to London, he and Jenny have a fight, during which Matt overhears that they are his birth parents. David implores Matt to remain in England and finish his schooling, while Jenny insists that Matt should accompany her on her world tour. Confused, Matt rejects Jenny's invitations and the two agree to see each other again sometime in the future.

Jenny turns to a night of drinking on the town to cope with the heartbreak and ends up twisting her ankle. At a clinic, she demands that David come to treat her. When he arrives, she claims to be quitting singing as she is "stretched too thin and everyone wants a bite," but David insists that she cannot let herself down this way and tells her that he loves her. At her concert that night, Jenny sings marvelously to the crowd. David leaves midway through her first number.

Cast 
 Judy Garland as Jenny Bowman
 Dirk Bogarde as David Donne
 Jack Klugman as George Kogan, Miss Bowman's manager
 Gregory Phillips as Matt
 Aline MacMahon as Ida, Miss Bowman's dresser
 Pauline Jameson as Miss Plimpton, Donne's nurse/receptionist
 Jeremy Burnham as Hospital surgeon
 Lorna Luft as Girl on boat (uncredited)
 Joseph Luft as Boy on boat (uncredited)
 Leon Cortez as Busker
 Robert Rietty as Manager, London Palladium
 Gerald Sim as Joe, Assistant Manager, London Palladium
 Frazer Hines as a Schoolboy
 Tony Robinson as a Schoolboy (uncredited)

Music 
All songs performed by Judy Garland:

 "I Am the Monarch of the Sea" (Judy Garland and Boys) from H.M.S. Pinafore by Gilbert and Sullivan 
 "Hello Bluebird", words and music by Cliff Friend
 "'It Never Was You" by Kurt Weill and Maxwell Anderson
 "By Myself" by Arthur Schwartz and Howard Dietz
 "I Could Go On Singing" by Harold Arlen and E. Y. Harburg

Reception 

In the New York Herald Tribune, Judith Crist wrote, "Either you are or you aren't - a Judy Garland fan that is. And if you aren't, forget about her new movie, I Could Go On Singing, and leave the discussion to us devotees. You'll see her in close-up...in beautiful, glowing Technicolor and striking staging in a vibrant, vital performance that gets to the essence of her mystique as a superb entertainer. Miss Garland is - as always - real, the voice throbbing, the eyes aglow, the delicate features yielding to the demands of the years - the legs still long and lovely. Certainly the role of a top-rank singer beset by the loneliness and emotional hungers of her personal life is not an alien one to her...",

Writing in the New York Daily News, Dorothy Masters said, "3 stars...Judy Garland is back on screen in a role that might have been custom-tailored for her particular talents. A new song, I Could Go On Singing, provides her with a little clowning, a chance to be gay, a time for wistfulness, an occasion for tears. She and Dirk Bogarde play wonderfully well together, even though the script itself insists on their being mismatched..."

Soundtrack
A soundtrack album was released by Capitol Records at the time of the original film release.

Novelization

A paperback novelization of the screenplay (uncredited in the book's authorship) was written by celebrated mystery novelist John D. MacDonald, perhaps best known as the creator of private investigator Travis McGee. It was published in 1963 by Gold Medal Books to coincide with the film's release. There was only one US printing, although a UK publisher, Robert Hale, followed up with a hardcover in 1964. In 2013, trade and ebook editions, tacitly marking the novelization's 50th anniversary and its first-ever reprint, were released by Random House; the ebook is still available.

Home media
The film was released on VHS in 1989 and on DVD in 2004. In 2016, it was released on Blu-ray disc by Twilight Time.

References

External links

 The Judy Garland Online Discography "I Could Go On Singing" pages.
 
 
 

1963 films
United Artists films
Films directed by Ronald Neame
Films about singers
1960s musical drama films
British drama films
American musical drama films
1963 drama films
1960s English-language films
1960s American films
1960s British films